Astyochia is a genus of moths in the family Geometridae.

Species
 Astyochia crane Druce, 1885
 Astyochia faula Druce, 1885
 Astyochia fessonia Druce, 1885
 Astyochia lachesis Schaus, 1912 - Costa Rica
 Astyochia nigrivena (Warren, 1897)
 Astyochia nigrivenata (Warren, 1900)

References
 Astyochia at Markku Savela's Lepidoptera and Some Other Life Forms

Ennominae
Geometridae genera